George Buck was an antiquarian.

George Buck may also refer to:
 George H. Buck Jr. (1928–2013), jazz record producer and curator
 George L. Buck (1866–1939), American teacher, businessman, and politician
 George M. Buck, Clerk to the U.S. Senate Committee on Privileges and Elections (ca. 1903)
 George S. Buck (1875–1931), mayor of Buffalo, New York
 George W. Buck (1789–1854), British civil engineer

See also
 George Buck Flower (1937–2004), American actor, writer and director
 George Buckley (disambiguation)